Mary Rose Oakar (born March 5, 1940) is an American Democratic politician and former member of the United States House of Representatives from Ohio, serving from 1977 to 1993. She was the first Democratic woman elected to the United States Congress from that state.  Oakar was also the first woman of Arab-American (Syrian and Lebanese) ancestry to serve in Congress. Oakar later served as a member of the Ohio State Board of Education.

Early life
Oakar, who graduated with a B.A. from Ursuline College in 1962 and an M.A. from John Carroll University in 1966, taught at Lourdes Academy, a Catholic high school for women, directed plays, taught at Cuyahoga Community College from 1968 to 1975 and served on the Cleveland City Council from 1973 to 1976 before winning election to the House from Ohio's 20th congressional district in Cleveland's West Side and the surrounding suburbs. She took office in 1977, succeeding James V. Stanton.

Political career
Oakar, one of very few Arab-American members of the House (she is of Lebanese and Syrian ancestry), became regarded as an increasingly powerful member. She was a high-ranking member of the Banking, Housing and Urban Affairs Committee, the Committee on Post Office and Civil Service and the House Administration Committee. Oakar's high placement on these committees allowed her to bring home to Cleveland large sums of money for urban renewal. Oakar forged strong relationships with Jewish groups in Cleveland. From 1985 to 1989, she was elected to a position in the House Democratic leadership, as Secretary of the House Democratic Caucus.

In 1991, she was one of nearly 100 Members of Congress involved in the widespread House banking scandal involving multiple overdrafts and bounced checks. The House Bank, not a normally operating financial institution, was used to pay members of the House. However, members were allowed to take advances on their pay checks without overdraft charges or repercussions to their credit. Oakar was indicted on seven counts, including lying to the FBI, filing false financial statements and using the House bank to convert public money for personal use. If sentenced, she could have received 40 years in prison and a $1.7 million fine.

She had used the names of straw donors on federal documents to conceal illegal contributions amounting to $16,000. Three counts against her were thrown out by the Supreme Court, the others were dropped after she entered a plea bargain in which she pleaded guilty to two misdemeanor charges; conspiracy and violation of election law.

In 1992, her district was renumbered the 10th and redrawn to include more Republicans, though it was still solidly Democratic. Oakar withstood a challenge from Cuyahoga County Commissioner Tim Hagan in the Democratic primary — Hagan had been endorsed by Cleveland Mayor Michael R. White — but lost to businessman Martin Hoke in the general election.

She won a 1999 libel settlement against Cleveland's newspaper, The Plain Dealer after seven years in court. In April 1992 the Cleveland's Plain Dealer released articles alleging that Oakar was forced to resign from a congressional task force after the House banking scandal. The paper acknowledged that the eight-term Democrat "was rightfully upset that erroneous information" had been printed.

Oakar unsuccessfully ran in the 2001 Cleveland Mayoral Primary and served a single term in the Ohio House of Representatives from 2000 to 2002.

In November 2012, she was elected to a four-year term on the Ohio State Board of Education where she represents District 11 which encompasses Ohio Senate districts 21, 23 and 25.

Personal
In 1979, the Supersisters trading card set was produced and distributed; one of the cards featured Oakar's name and picture.

Oakar served as president of the American-Arab Anti-Discrimination Committee (ADC) from 2003 through 2010. ADC describes itself as the largest Arab-American grassroots civil-rights organization in the U.S.

See also 
 List of American federal politicians convicted of crimes
 List of Arab and Middle-Eastern Americans in the United States Congress
 List of federal political scandals in the United States
 Women in the United States House of Representatives

References

External links 

Profile on the Ohio Ladies' Gallery website
 

|-

|-

1940 births
21st-century American politicians
21st-century American women politicians
American people of Syrian descent
American politicians of Lebanese descent
American politicians of Syrian descent
Arab-American culture in Ohio
Cleveland City Council members
Democratic Party members of the United States House of Representatives from Ohio
Female members of the United States House of Representatives
John Carroll University alumni
Living people
Democratic Party members of the Ohio House of Representatives
Middle Eastern Christians
Ohio politicians convicted of crimes
Women state legislators in Ohio
Women city councillors in Ohio